Louise Egestorp (born 28 February 1994) is a Danish handball player who currently plays for Nykøbing Falster Håndboldklub.

References
 

1994 births
Living people
Handball players from Copenhagen
Danish female handball players
Nykøbing Falster Håndboldklub players